D29, D-29 or D.29 may refer to:

 , a light cruiser which served with the Royal Australian Navy during World War II
 , formerly USS Cushing (DD-797), a destroyer transferred to the Brazilian Navy in 1961 and given penant number D29
 , formerly USS Sample (FF-1048), a frigate transferred to the Brazilian Navy in 1989 and given penant number D29
 , formerly USS Collett (DD-730), a destroyer sold to the Argentinian Navy in 1974
 New Standard D-29, a commercial pilot trainer aircraft produced in the United States between 1929 and 1930
 D29 road (Croatia), a state road
 LNER Class D29, a class of British steam locomotives

Ship disambiguation pages